Shigeru Kitamura (北村滋, Kitamura Shigeru) is current Participate of Cabinet Secretariat, National Security Secretariat Secretary General in Japan under Shinzo Abe and a former head of the Cabinet Intelligence and Research Office, a Japanese intelligence agency.

History
Shigeru joined the National Police Agency in 1980, serving as the head in Tokushima Prefecture, chief of its Security Division, and Director of the Foreign Affairs Division. He was in charge of the police response to cases of North Korean abductions of Japanese citizens. In October 2018, he met with his North Korean counterparts from the United Front Department of the Workers' Party of Korea in Mongolia to discuss the abduction issue.

References

Japanese government officials
Japanese spies
Living people
Year of birth missing (living people)